The Austin class was a class of twelve amphibious transport dock ships in service with the United States Navy from 1965 to 2017. Note that the U.S. Naval Vessel Registry list separate Cleveland (seven built) and Trenton (two built) class ships, but most sources lists them as a single class. Trenton was sold to India and is the only ship still active.

Design
The Austin class was an enlarged version of the preceding . Designed under project SCB 187B, the ships are about  longer which increased the displacement by some 3,300 tons. The dock is as large as that of the Raleigh-class. In front of the dock was a 70m long raised level to park vehicles which was connected via a ramp to the flight deck. The ramp ended in a new telescoping hangar. Although the flight deck had room for up to six CH-46 Sea Knight helicopters, the hangar was only a temporary shelter for a single helicopter and not a permanent facility. The propulsion consists of two Foster Wheeler boilers (600 psi), powering two De Laval GT turbines, providing 12,000 SHP each for the two propellers.

The reason for creating a Cleveland/Trenton sub-class is that the last nine ships of the class were built as flagships for amphibious ready groups with an additional deck above the bridge and accommodations for additional 90 personnel. The SPS-40 radar is also placed higher on the mast. Otherwise the ships are identical. Originally the ships were armed only with four 3-inch/50-caliber gun Mark 33 twin mounts. These were later removed and the weapon stations were used to fit two Phalanx CIWS.

The last ship of the class, LPD-16, while authorized, was cancelled before being constructed.  served for 10 years as an LPD before she was converted into a command ship. She kept her hull number and was redesignated AGF-11. From 2012 to 2017,  served with the United States Military Sealift Command as a forward base ship with helicopter facilities, which was designated "Afloat Forward Staging Base, Interim".

Ships

References

Notes

Sources

External links

 U.S. Navy Fact File: Amphibious Transport Dock - LPD
 Federation of American Scientists: LPD 4 Austin class
 GlobalSecurity.org: LPD 4 Austin class

 Austin class amphibious transport dock
 Austin class amphibious transport dock
 Austin class amphibious transport dock
Amphibious warfare vessel classes